Baeometra is a genus in the family Colchicaceae containing a single species, Baeometra uniflora. It is native to South Africa, where it is commonly called beetle lily due to the dark markings on the tepals. The genus was erected when the British botanist Richard Salisbury described the species "Baeometra columellaris" in 1812, although the plant had already been discovered, described and painted in 1793 by the Austrian botanist Nikolaus Joseph von Jacquin under the name Melanthium uniflorum. The correct name for the species was thus settled in 1941 by the South African botanist Gwendolyn Lewis to be Baeometra uniflora (Salisb.) G.J.Lewis. The epithet means "single-flowered", which is contradicted by the fact that the stem usually bears at least two yellowish flowers.

The species is related to the genus Wurmbea, which is present in southern Africa and Australia, and is known to be a poisonous plant containing the alkaloid colchicine. It has been introduced to Australia, where it is considered to be an invasive and unwanted addition to the local flora.

References

Colchicaceae
Flora of South Africa
Monotypic Liliales genera
Colchicaceae genera